Tournefort may refer to:

 Joseph Pitton de Tournefort (1656–1708), French botanist
 Tournefort, Alpes-Maritimes, a commune in the Alpes-Maritimes département, in France
 Cape Tournefort, a headland in Sleaford Bay, in South Australia, Australia